WASC may refer to: 

 Supreme Court of Western Australia
 WASC (AM), a radio station (1530 AM) licensed to Spartanburg, South Carolina, United States
 West Africa Submarine Cable
 West African School Certificate
 Western Association of Schools and Colleges
 Wisconsin Association of School Councils